Heru Setyawan (born 10 March 1993) is Indonesian professional footballer who plays as a midfielder for Liga 2 club Kalteng Putra.

Club career

PSIS Semarang
In 2019, Heru Setyawan signed a contract with Indonesian Liga 1 club PSIS Semarang. He made his debut on 6 July 2019 in a match against Persela Lamongan. On 11 September 2019, Heru scored his first goal for PSIS against PSM Makassar in the 63rd minute at the Andi Mattalatta Stadium, Makassar.

Persela Lamongan
He was signed for Persela Lamongan to play in Liga 1 in the 2020 season. Heru made his league debut on 1 March 2020 in a match against Persib Bandung at the Si Jalak Harupat Stadium, Soreang. This season was suspended on 27 March 2020 due to the COVID-19 pandemic. The season was abandoned and was declared void on 20 January 2021.

PSIM Yogyakarta
In 2021, Heru Setyawan signed a contract with Indonesian Liga 2 club PSIM Yogyakarta. He made his league debut on 12 October in a 0–0 draw against Persis Solo at the Manahan Stadium, Surakarta.

References

External links
 Heru Setyawan at Soccerway
 Heru Setyawan at Liga Indonesia

Living people
1993 births
Association football midfielders
Indonesian footballers
Persis Solo players
Persita Tangerang players
PSIS Semarang players
People from Semarang
Sportspeople from Central Java